was a  after Daiei and before Tenbun. This era spanned from August 1528 to July 1532.

Change of era
 1528 :  The era name was changed to mark the enthronement of Emperor Go-Nara. The previous era ended and a new one commenced in Daiei 8, the 20th day of the 8th month.
This nengō takes its name from the I Ching: "He who sits on the Imperial Throne enjoys Heaven's Favor (居天位享天禄).

Events of the Kyōroku era

 1528 (Kyōroku 1): Fire damaged Yakushi-ji in Nara.
 1528 (Kyōroku 1): Former kampaku Konoe Tanye became sadaijin. The former naidaijin, Minamoto-no Mitsikoto, becomes the udaijin.  Former dainagon Kiusho Tanemitsi becomes naidaijin.
 1529 (Kyōroku 2): Neo-Confucian scholar Wang Yangming died.
 1530 (Kyōroku 3, 7th month): The former-kampaku Kiyusho Hisatsune died at the age of 63.
 1531 (Kyōroku 4): The Kamakura shogunate office of shugo (governor) is abolished.
 1532 (Kyōroku 5): Followers of the Ikko sect were driven out of Kyoto; and they settled in Osaka.

Notes

References
 Nussbaum, Louis Frédéric and Roth, Käthe. (2005). Japan Encyclopedia. Cambridge: Harvard University Press. ; OCLC 48943301
 Titsingh, Isaac. (1834). Nihon Ōdai Ichiran; ou,  Annales des empereurs du Japon.  Paris: Royal Asiatic Society, Oriental Translation Fund of Great Britain and Ireland. OCLC 5850691

External links
 National Diet Library, "The Japanese Calendar" -- historical overview plus illustrative images from library's collection

Japanese eras
1520s in Japan
1530s in Japan